The individual eventing was an equestrian event held as part of the Equestrian at the 1964 Summer Olympics programme.  The event was held from 16 to 19 October.

Medalists

Results

There was a dressage test, an endurance test, and a jumping test.  The penalties accrued in each were summed to give a final score.  It was possible to earn negative penalties in the endurance test; thus, some pairs finished with a negative score.

References

Sources
 

Equestrian at the 1964 Summer Olympics